Jean Erica Sherlock Chapman (15 February 1926 – 26 June 2012) was an Australian writer. Her works for children included picture books, short stories, poetry and novels as well as radio and television scripts.

Chapman was employed by the Australian Broadcasting Commission as a freelance scriptwriter from 1957, including on radio programs such as Kindergarten of the Air.

Awards and recognition 
The Wish Cat was awarded the 1969 Austrian State Award for Children's Literature. The Sugar-Plum Christmas Book was joint winner of the Australia Council's 1978 Visual Arts Board Award.

Chapman won the 1990 Lady Cutler Award which recognises "distinguished service to children's literature".

Selected works 

 Amelia Muddle, illustrated by Adye Adams, 1963
The Wish Cat, drawings by Noela Young and photographs by Dean Hay, 1966
 Tell Me a Tale: Stories, songs and things to do, illustrated by Deborah and Kilmeny Niland, music by Margaret Moore, 1974
 The Sugar-Plum Christmas Book: A book for Christmas and all the days of the year, 1977
 Velvet Paws and Whiskers, illustrated by Deborah Niland, music by Margaret Moore, 1979
 Pancakes and Painted Eggs: A book for Easter and all the days of the year, illustrated by Kilmeny Niland, music by Margaret Moore, 1981

Later life and death 
Chapman died in a Sydney nursing home on 26 June 2012, having earlier suffered a stroke.

References 

1926 births
2012 deaths
Australian children's writers